P2Y purinoceptor 1 is a protein that in humans is encoded by the P2RY1 gene.

Function 

The product of this gene, P2Y1 belongs to the family of G-protein coupled receptors. This family has several receptor subtypes with different pharmacological selectivity, which overlaps in some cases, for various adenosine and uridine nucleotides. This receptor functions as a receptor for extracellular ATP and ADP. In platelets binding to ADP leads to mobilization of intracellular calcium ions via activation of phospholipase C, a change in platelet shape, and probably to platelet aggregation.

See also 
 P2Y receptor

References

Further reading

External links 
 

G protein-coupled receptors